Alexander Bublik was the defending champion but chose not to defend his title.

Thanasi Kokkinakis won the title after defeating Lloyd Harris 6–2, 6–3 in the final.

Seeds

Draw

Finals

Top half

Bottom half

References
Main Draw
Qualifying Draw

Nordic Naturals Challenger - Singles
2018 Singles